American Premier Underwriters is a property and casualty insurance company that was established as the Pennsylvania Railroad in 1846. It was formerly known as the Penn Central Transportation Company and it currently owns non-rail assets. The company is headquartered in Cincinnati, Ohio. In addition to casualty insurance, the company is also in the business of fire and marine insurance.

History 
During the nineteenth century the company was the Pennsylvania Railroad. It was established on April 13, 1846. In March 1994, the company went through a name change and became American Premier Underwriters, Inc. 

In December 1994, the company, which was 40.4 percent owned by the American Financial Corporation, announced that it would be acquiring the parent company in a stock merger. 

In 1995, as a publicly traded company, APU reportedly had 5,400 employees and sales of $1.8 billion.

Amtrak lawsuit 
The company sued Amtrak to force the passenger railroad company to redeem shares that Penn Central received at the time it transferred much of its passenger rail assets to Amtrak.  The case was dismissed in 2015.

References

Companies based in Cincinnati
Financial services companies of the United States